Abdel Salam Al Nabulsy (23 August 1899 – 5 July 1968) was an Egyptian actor of Lebanese-Palestinian origin.

Life

Nabulsy was born in Tripoli, Lebanon, in 1899, and died 1968 in Beirut. He is known for Egyptian movies in which he co-starred with renowned actors like Ismail Yasin, Abdel Halim Hafez, Faten Hamama and Farid El Atrash 

Nabulsy studied in Egypt at Al-Azhar University. While there, he developed an interest in acting. He acted on stage for a while and when his family got wind of his new career, they stopped sending him money so that he may focus instead on his studies. Acting afforded Nabulsy a way to earn a living. While he portrayed some evil if not too violent characters, his filmography was generally characterized by comedic roles.

He died in Beirut in 1968.

Filmography

 Yom min omri (1961)
 Ashour kalb el assad (1961)
 Ahlam al banat (1960)
 Bayn el samaa wa el ard (1960)
 Itharissi minal hub (1960)
 Hekayat hub (1959)
 Ismail Yassine bolis harbi (1959)
 Sharia el hub (1959)
 Fata ahlami (1957)
 Ard el salam (1957)
 El-Kalb Loh Ahkam (1957)
 Wadda'tu hubbak (1957)
 Hub wa insania (1956)
 Mogezat el samaa (1956)
 N'harak said (1955)
 El Ard el Tayeba (1954)
 El Mohtal (1954)
 Ayza atgawwez (1952)
 Ma takulshi la hada (1952)
 Taa la salim (1951)
 Akher kedba (1950)
 Afrita hanem (1949)
 Ahebbak inta (1949)
 El Warsha (1941)

References

External links

 
 Interview video with Nabulsi's widow

1899 births
1968 deaths
People from Tripoli, Lebanon
Lebanese actors
Al-Azhar University alumni
Lebanese people of Palestinian descent
20th-century Egyptian male actors
Egyptian male film actors
Egyptian comedians
20th-century comedians